The Wasatch Plateau is a plateau located southeast of the southernmost part of the Wasatch Range in central Utah. It is a part of the Colorado Plateau.

Geography
The plateau is roughly bordered by the Spanish Fork Canyon on the north, the Price Canyon on the northeast, the Castle Valley on the east and southeast, Interstate 70 on the south, the Plateau Valley and the Sevier Plateau on the southwest, and the Sanpete Valley on the northwest. The majority of the plateau is within the boundaries of the Manti–La Sal National Forest and is managed by the United States Forest Service.

See also

References

External links

Plateaus of Utah
Landforms of Carbon County, Utah
Landforms of Sanpete County, Utah
Landforms of Utah County, Utah
Manti-La Sal National Forest